Wekiwa Springs State Park is a  Florida State Park in Apopka, Florida. It is located 20 minutes north of Orlando, off Interstate 4 at exit 94, near Altamonte Springs and Longwood. The park also contains the head water of the Wekiva River. It also serves as the headquarters of one of the state's five AmeriCorps Florida State Parks chapters.

Although the springs are spelled Wekiwa Springs, the river and most subdivisions and streets in Seminole County use the Wekiva spelling. Wekiwa is the Creek word for a spring, but contrary to popular belief that Wekiva means "flowing water", it was actually an alternate spelling used by developers.

History

In the 1800s, Central Florida was primarily agricultural; however, with the end of the Civil War, a tourist trade started to take advantage of Florida’s temperate winters, long summers and natural environment, and out of that growth came Wekiwa Springs. In 1941, the Apopka Sportsmen’s Club purchased the property from the Wilson Cypress Company, which had maintained a small turpentine camp in what is now the park, maintaining the area for recreational use. John H. Land, Mayor of Apopka, Florida, and co-owner of the Apopka Sportsmen's Club campaigned the Florida State Legislature for three years to preserve the land. By 1969 the state of Florida expressed interest in the property for use as a state park, and, starting in 1970, visitors have come for the natural spring, crystal clear water, and the area's wildlife.

Attractions

The spring
The main attraction at Wekiwa Springs Park is the spring, providing approximately 42 million gallons of water to the Wekiva River each day.  The swimming area varies in depth from under a foot to five feet, and a small  cavern at the source of the spring.  The cavern extends deeper into a cave, which has been explored in great detail. SCUBA and cave diving is strictly prohibited. The park has a nature center, and access to Wekiwa Springs, Wekiwa Springs Run, Rock Springs Run and the Wekiva River. Picnic pavilions equipped with charcoal grills exist in the picnic area. Canoes can be rented at the nature center. There are four campsites in Wekiwa Springs State Park that can only be accessed by canoe or kayak.

Camping
Infrastructure exists to support all forms and types of camping from tents to recreational vehicles. Family, primitive and cabin youth camping areas are available. Pets are allowed, but must be leashed at all times. Intoxicants are prohibited.

Trails and hiking
There is a network of trails in the park, allowing for bicycling, hiking, and horseback riding. A trail connects the main parking area with a distant parking lot at Sand Lake within the State park.

Ecology
The area around the spring is largely undeveloped and has acres of untouched Florida Ecology. Among the wildlife of the park are  coyote, rabbit, deer, gray fox, bobcat, raccoon, opossum, alligator, and black bear. Fishing is permitted, as well as canoeing and snorkeling. However, SCUBA and specifically cave diving are not. The cave has been explored in the past to a distance of about 50 meters.

Administrative
Florida state parks are open between 8 a.m. and sundown every day of the year (including holidays). The nature center is open Saturday and Sunday from noon to 3:00 p.m. EST.

References

External links 
 Wekiwa Springs State Park at Florida State Parks
 Wekiwa Springs State Park at State Parks
 Wekiwa Springs State Park at Absolutely Florida
 Wekiwa Springs State Park at Wildernet

State parks of Florida
Parks in Orange County, Florida
Springs of Florida
Protected areas established in 1969
Nature centers in Florida
Apopka, Florida
Bodies of water of Orange County, Florida
1969 establishments in Florida